Wartburgkreis I is an electoral constituency (German: Wahlkreis) represented in the Landtag of Thuringia. It elects one member via first-past-the-post voting. Under the current constituency numbering system, it is designated as constituency 5. It covers the southern part of Wartburgkreis and a small area of Schmalkalden-Meiningen.

Wartburgkreis I was created for the 1994 state election. Since 2019, it has been represented by Martin Henkel of the Christian Democratic Union (CDU).

Geography
As of the 2019 state election, Wartburgkreis I covers the southern part of Wartburgkreis and a small area of Schmalkalden-Meiningen, specifically the municipalities of Bad Salzungen (excluding Ettenhausen an der Suhl), Buttlar, Dermbach, Empfertshausen, Geisa, Gerstengrund, Krayenberggemeinde, Leimbach, Oechsen, Schleid, Unterbreizbach, Vacha, Weilar, and Wiesenthal (from Wartburgkreis), and Kaltennordheim (excluding Aschenhausen, Kaltensundheim, Kaltenwestheim, Melpers, Mittelsdorf, Oberkatz und Unterweid) from Schmalkalden-Meiningen.

Members
The constituency has been held by the Christian Democratic Union since its creation in 1994. Its first representative was Hans-Peter Häfner, who served from 1994 to 1999, followed by Manfred Grob (1999–2019) and Martin Henkel (2019–present).

Election results

2019 election

2014 election

2009 election

2004 election

1999 election

1994 election

References

Electoral districts in Thuringia
1994 establishments in Germany
Wartburgkreis
Constituencies established in 1994